The Rajah of Shivapore is a comic opera with music by Alfred Hill and libretto by David Souter.

The story 
The temple to Shiva at Shivapore has been barricaded by the corrupt tippler temple-keeper Chunder, to hide the fact that he has pawned the little golden idol. His only hope of escaping retribution is to persuade his lovely but reluctant daughter, Aimee, to marry the Rajah after somehow disposing of his Ranee. Another rogue, the necromancer Bunder, has his own cunning plan, which involves exchanging the idol with a cheap replica. Aimee's vagabond lover Jengis thwarts both plans by impersonating the god, and so wins the girl. The Rajah, who has not only been cheated of his prize but also defrauded, orders decapitations all round, but then a supposed Hindustani beggar reveals himself as the Emperor, and everyone gets their just dues.

The songs 
"Just One of the Girls" (Bul-Bul)
"What's a Maid to Do ?" (Bul-Bul)
"Sad is the Heart" (Aimee)
"Heigho" (Aimee)
"Versatility"
"Coughdrop"
"The Wine of Joy" (Jengis)
"Sword of Mine" (Jengis)
"Maid of the Dear Eyes" (The Rajah)
"But Yesterday" (Jengis and Aimee)
"Love it is the Song" (Jengis and Aimee)
"My Beloved" (Jengis and Aimee)
also
Traditional Indian chant (The Rajah)

Premiere 
It was first performed at The Playhouse, Sydney from 15 December 1917 to 5 January 1918; produced by Sydney James, of "Royal Strollers" fame, and directed by Frederick Ward.

Personnel

Aimee, the temple-keeper's daughter — Miss Alice Bennetto
Jengis (or Zengis), the handsome troubador — John Quinlan
The Rajah — George Whitehead
Chunder, the corrupt temple-keeper – Frank Hawthorne
Bunder, the scheming necromancer – Frederick Ward
The Emperor – David Drayton
Bul-Bul, temple attendant — Miss Vera Spaull, her first appearance in an adult role
plus chorus and dancers
Costume design — David Souter
Scenic design — Jack Mann
Fight choreography — Frank Stewart, of Sydney Swords Club

Reception
Despite wartime constraints, the opera was received enthusiastically by the first-night audience which, in that tiny auditorium, consisted largely of knowledgeable theatregoers and music lovers.

Later performances 
Brisbane (12–19 January 1918) at His Majesty's Theatre
Toowoomba (21, 22 January 1918) at the Town Hall. A poor turnout was attributed to wet weather.
Melbourne (9 February 1918 – 2 March 1918) at the Princess Theatre.
Two sensations marked this production: Frank Grahame (real name Ernest William Gollmick), who was to play the Rajah, was charged with deserting his children, but was given bail so he could perform at the opening night, and Robert Colville (real name Bert Coghlan) collapsed and died at an after-show party on 24 February.

Hill stated in 1959, aged 89, that he was revising the work.

Notes and references

1917 musicals
Australian musicals
English-language operas
1917 operas